Başçayır is a village in the District of Köşk, Aydın Province, Turkey. As of 2010, it had a population of 1614.

References

Villages in Köşk District